Frederick Twynam (1806 in England – 6 January 1868 at Portswood, Hampshire) was an English first-class cricketer.

Twynam represented Hampshire in three first-class matches, making his debut in 1848 against an All-England Eleven. Twynam played two further first-class matches in 1849 and 1850, both of which were against the All-England Eleven.

Twynam died on 6 January 1868 at Portswood, Hampshire.

External links
Frederick Twynam at Cricinfo
Frederick Twynam at CricketArchive

1806 births
1868 deaths
English cricketers
Hampshire cricketers